Ota Kohoutek (born 23 May 2003) is a Czech footballer who currently plays as a midfielder for Zbrojovka Brno.

Club career

FC Zbrojovka Brno
He made his professional debut for Zbrojovka Brno in the home match against Chrudim on 21 November 2021. He replaced Martin Sedlák in the 63rd minute of the match. In additional time of this match he scored his premiere goal and helped his team to 3-2 win.

References

External links
 Profile at FC Zbrojovka Brno official site
 Profile at FAČR official site

2003 births
Living people
Czech footballers
FC Zbrojovka Brno players
Association football midfielders
People from Brno
Czech National Football League players